Kyabaggu Kabinuli was Kabaka of the Kingdom of Buganda from 1750 until 1780. He was the twenty-fifth (25th) Kabaka of Buganda.

Claim to the throne
He was the third son of Prince Musanje Golooba. His mother was Nabulya Naluggwa of the Ndiga (Sheep) clan, the second (2nd) of his father's three (3) wives. He ascended to the throne upon the abdication of his elder brother Kabaka Namuggala Kagali in 1750. He established his capital at Lubya Hill.

Married life

He is recorded to have married twenty (20) wives:
 Gwolyoowa, daughter Mwamba?, of the Lugave clan
 Kiriibwa, daughter of Sebugulu, of the Lugave clan
 Magota, daughter of Namukoka, of the Mamba clan
 Misinga, daughter of Natiigo, of the Lugave clan
 Mbigidde, daughter of Terwewalwa, of the Nvuma clan
 Nabiweke, daughter of Seggiriinya, of the Ngo clan
 Nabugere, daughter of Sekayiba, of the Ffumbe clan
 Nagalaale, daughter of Lule, of the Ngonge clan
 Naabakyaala Najjemba, the Omubikka,  daughter of Lule, of the Ngonge clan
 Nalubimbi, daughter of Namwaama, of the Kkobe clan
 Nalugooti, daughter of Masembe, of the Nsenene clan
 Nalunga, daughter of Lugunju, of the Nvuma clan
 Nalwondooba, daughter of Nankere, of the Mamba clan
 Namayanja, daughter of Budde, of the Mamba clan. She killed her husband in a rage in 1750, prior to marrying the Kabaka.
 Nambooze, daughter of Namwaama, of the Kkobe clan
 Nankanja, daughter of Nakabalira, of the Nvuma clan
 Nanteza, daughter of Kakembo, of the Njovu clan
 Nfambe, daughter of Sekayiba, of the Ffumbe clan
 Nanzigu
 Nakalyoowa.

Issue

Kabaka Kyabaggu fathered many children. Among his children are the following:

 Prince (Omulangira) Sanya, whose mother was Misinga
 Prince (Omulangira) Mbajjwe, whose mother was Nabugere
 Prince (Omulangira) Saku, whose mother was Nalubimbi
 Prince (Omulangira) Wango, whose mother was Nalwondooba
 Prince (Omulangira) Kalema, whose mother was Nambooze. He contested the succession on the death of his father. Defeated by his brother, Jjunju, and fled to Bunyoro
 Prince (Omulangira) Kibuli
 Prince (Omulangira) Kigoye, whose mother was Nambooze
 Prince (Omulangira) Lubambula.
 Prince (Omulangira) Mukama. He rebelled against his half-brother, Kabaka Jjunju. He was killed by his half-brother, Prince Semakookiro, after 1780.
 Prince (Omulangira) Wakayima. Prince Wakayima was the father of Prince (Omulangira) Sewaya.
 Kabaka Junju Sendegeya, Kabaka of Buganda from 1780 to 1797, whose mother was Nanteza.
 Kabaka Semakookiro Wasajja Nabbunga, Kabaka of Buganda between 1797 and 1814, whose mother was Nanteza.
 Prince (Omulangira) Sekafuuwa, whose mother was Namayanja. He was killed in battle at Mulago, by his half-brother, Prince Wakayima, in 1780.
 Prince (Omulangira) Kiribatta, whose mother was Namayanja. He was killed in battle at Mulago, by his half-brother, Kabaka Jjunju, in 1780.
 Prince (Omulangira) Kikunta, whose mother was Namayanja. He was killed in battle at Mulago, by his half-brother, Kabaka Junju, in 1780.
 Princess (Omumbejja) Nsekere, whose mother was Gwolyoowa
 Princess (Omumbejja) Nalukwaakula, whose mother was Nagalaale
 Princess (Omumbejja) Nakayiza
 Princess (Omumbejja) Zansanze, whose mother was Nanteza

The final years
Kabaka Kyabaggu was killed by Kikoso, valet to Nakirindisa, at Namubiru, in 1780. He was initially buried at Mereera. In 1869, his remains were exhumed and re-buried at Kyebando.

Succession table

See also
 Kabaka of Buganda

References

External links
List of the Kings of Buganda

Kabakas of Buganda
18th-century monarchs in Africa
1780 deaths
Year of birth unknown